The Gardo House was the official residence of the president of the Church of Jesus Christ of Latter-day Saints (LDS Church) during the tenures of John Taylor and Wilford Woodruff.

Construction
Joseph Ridges, designer and builder of the original Salt Lake Tabernacle organ, and William H. Folsom, Young's father-in-law, worked together to draw the plans and superintend the construction. Folsom, who had been LDS Church Architect from 1861 to 1867, had played a vital role in the design and construction of the Salt Lake Theatre, Salt Lake Tabernacle, St. George Tabernacle, Salt Lake Temple, Manti Temple, St. George Temple, and many private residences. He was also the father of Harriet Amelia Folsom Young.

Located in Salt Lake City at 70 E. South Temple, the structure was built to the south of Brigham Young's Beehive House, and directly east of the 1855 LDS Church historian's office. Construction began in 1873; after completion, it was dedicated on February 22, 1883.

The finished home had four levels, including the basement, with a tower on the northwest corner. The foundation and basement were made of granite. The exterior walls were of 2 x 6 studs infilled with adobe bricks, with lath and plaster on the inside and two layers of lath and stucco on the outside. The interior woodwork, which included a spiral staircase, paneling, and decorative trim, was carved in black walnut by local artists. Elegant furnishings, paintings by local artists, and mirrors imported from Europe graced all the rooms. Several writers estimated that the church expended between $30,000 and $50,000 to finish the building and furnish its interior. Wilford Woodruff estimated the cost at $15,000. The Salt Lake Tribune claimed that Ralph Ramsay, a famous Utah woodcarver, did some of the woodwork in the Gardo. Ramsay had done woodwork in the Beehive House and Lion House and had carved the eagle on the original Eagle Gate. However, he moved from Salt Lake City to Richfield in 1874, which may have precluded him from working on the Gardo House. In addition, it has been noted that the style of the woodwork in the Gardo was dissimilar to known examples of Ramsay's work.

History 
During the last years of his life, Brigham Young perceived a need for a place where he could receive official callers and entertain the dignitaries who traveled great distances to see him.  This idea goes as far back as the Nauvoo Era, in which Joseph Smith proposed a similar idea under the name of the Mansion House. The Mansion House was to act as a place for travelers to come and stay in Nauvoo with hospitality in mind.

Young was fond of naming his homes; one source claims that he borrowed the name Gardo from a favorite Spanish novel.

Progress on the mansion was slow. There were numerous delays in obtaining the necessary lumber, plaster, granite and glass. Young, who was often away on church business, was seldom available to sign requisitions or make important decisions. However, on one occasion, after returning to Salt Lake City from a visit to St. George, he expressed displeasure with the style of the home, calling it his "tabernacle organ." The mansion was dedicated on February 22, 1883.

After three years of construction, the Gardo House was nearing completion when an unfortunate accident occurred near Arsenal Hill (now Capitol Hill), a repository for gunpowder and explosives. On April 5, 1876, two young hunters fired their guns into one of the powder magazines. The resulting explosion showered the city with 500 tons of boulders, concrete, and pebbles. Many persons were injured; some, including the hunters, were killed. The explosion also broke several of the glass windows in the Gardo House, and new glass had to be ordered from the East. By May 20 the windows were reinstalled and construction had resumed.

Brigham Young never lived to see the completed mansion; he died on August 29, 1877. The settlement of Young's estate was divided into three parts: church properties in Young's name, properties belonging to his private estate, and properties where legal ownership was unknown. In his will, Young had provided both Mary Ann Angell Young and Harriet Amelia Folsom Young a life tenancy in the Gardo House, and in order to secure their claims, the two women occupied the mansion briefly while it was still under construction. Although the legal ownership of the mansion was in question, the settlement credited it to Young's heirs instead of to the church, at the highly inflated figure of $120,000. Of this sum, approximately $20,000 was paid to Mary Ann Angell Young and Harriet Amelia Folsom Young.

John Taylor succeeded Young as church president. His counselor George Q. Cannon and other church leaders suggested that Taylor occupy the Gardo House after its completion, but he repeatedly refused. However, when church members unanimously voted on April 9, 1879, to make the Gardo House the official parsonage for LDS Church presidents, Taylor reluctantly accepted their decision. Moses Thatcher, William Jennings, and Angus M. Cannon were appointed as a committee to oversee completion of the mansion.

On December 27, 1881, the Deseret News published a letter from John Taylor announcing a public reception and tour of the Gardo House on January 2, 1882, from 11 a.m. until 3 p.m. More than two thousand people attended the reception and toured the home. Taylor greeted all the visitors, who were entertained by two bands and several renditions by the Tabernacle Choir. An early visitor to the mansion was Oscar Wilde, whom Taylor introduced to the residence while showing Wilde around Salt Lake on April 10, 1882. Wilde spoke well of the house saying it "had a good deal of feeling in it in the pleasing works of art and good furniture." A year later, on February 22, 1883, the mansion was dedicated as a "House unto the Lord" in a dedicatory prayer offered by Apostle Franklin D. Richards. Moses Thatcher, William Jennings, Angus M. Cannon, and their wives were particularly noted as being among the guests. Also noted were Joseph F. Smith, Franklin D. Richards, Francis M. Lyman, John H. Smith, and Daniel H. Wells.

By the time John Taylor became church president, the Edmunds-Tucker Act was putting intense pressure on him to observe this anti-bigamy law. He sought to comply with the law by moving into the Gardo House with his sister, Agnes Taylor. She took over management of the mansion while he continued his duties as president.

The Victorian mansion was demolished on November 26, 1921.

Controversy

"Amelia's Palace" 
There were widespread rumors that the Gardo House was built for Harriet Amelia Folsom Young; allegedly she was Brigham Young's favorite wife. It was indeed Young's intent that Amelia would act as the official hostess for the building. According to his daughter Susa Young Gates, family members agreed that Amelia, who was young, childless, mannerly, and talented, was well suited to assume such a responsibility. Since the Gardo House's intent was to welcome visitors to and also to promote a positive perception of the Latter-day Saints. Thus the claim that the house was built solely for Amelia's pleasure, as an act of favoritism, is a misinterpretation, when it was actually a specific calling for her upon which the family apparently agreed.

Since Harriet Folsom Young's father was the chief architect it is reasonable to insist that there was extra attention given to the detail of the home by her father, though this would be the act of a loving father and not Brigham Young.

John Taylor 
John Taylor succeeded Young as church president. His counselor George Q. Cannon and other church leaders suggested that Taylor occupy the Gardo House after its completion, but he repeatedly refused. However, when church members unanimously voted on April 9, 1879, to make the Gardo House the official parsonage for LDS church presidents, President Taylor reluctantly accepted their decision. Some  believed that the Gardo House was built too extravagantly for church leaders to live in, considering the persecutions and generally humble origins of the church.

In March 1885, soon after John Taylor's final public appearance, federal marshals made a massive raid on the mansion to capture him. This and subsequent raids were unsuccessful, and his "tough-minded sister ... often held raiding marshals and deputies at bay at the front door of the mansion, admitting no one unless he presented papers properly signed by a federal judge." After her brother's 1887 death, Taylor vacated the house.

Rachel Emma Woolley Simmons recorded in her journal her personal discontent not with John Taylor moving into the home but citing the "... great expense to furnish it in the style it had to be ...". She also believed that Taylor was not pleased with moving or were his wives.

The Salt Lake Daily Tribune was extremely critical of the affair and of the church in general. In an editorial published the day before the reception, the newspaper wrote, " The favored saints have received an invitation to call upon President John Taylor at the Amelia Palace tomorrow. ... We want the poor Mormons ... to mark the carpets, mirrors, the curtains and the rest, and then to go home and look at the squalor of their own homes, their unkempt wives, their miserable children growing up in despair and ignorance, and then to reflect how much better it would have been for them, instead of working hard for wages ... if they had only started out as did Uncle John, determined to serve God for nothing but hash." The Tribune went on to accuse the church of attempting "to build up an aristocracy in Utah, where the few are to rule in luxury, while the many, to support the luxury, are to toil and suffer."

On January 5, 1882, the Deseret News published a rebuttal to the Tribune's scathing editorial. The newspaper pointed out Taylor had taken up his residence in the Gardo House in response to the vote of the Mormon people and that he, as church president, should be taken care of considering the adversity which he personally endured, he was with Joseph Smith the day he was killed back in 1844, and hoped to do so at a level that those in "Church and State elsewhere" were.

Taylor himself also wrote a letter, published in the Deseret News, expressing his feelings about the situation. He reminded critics of his initial reluctance to move to the Gardo House and his concern that his occupancy of the mansion would place an intolerable barrier between him and church members. Taylor acknowledged that his family had also been opposed to the move, preferring their own homes and familiar surroundings. He explained he had eventually been persuaded that "Zion should become the praise of the whole earth, and that we in this land should take a prominent and leading part in the arts, sciences, architecture, literature, and in everything that would tend to ... exalt and ennoble Zion. [It is the president's duty] to take the lead in everything that is calculated to ... place Zion where she ought to be, first and foremost among the peoples."

Both newspapers were correct in implying that the issue of the Gardo House was much broader than the mere occupation of the mansion by a Mormon leader. To Mormons, who had celebrated their church's jubilee in April 1880, the house was a symbol of achievement. It was tangible proof that the persecutions and hardships they had endured over the past fifty years were not in vain. On the other hand, many non-Mormons viewed Taylor's installation in the home as a threat in the continuing struggle for economic and political supremacy.

Prophecy
John Taylor's move to the Gardo House was regarded by some Mormons as the fulfillment of a prophecy. Legend had it that some years before, when Taylor's financial circumstances had been the poorest, Heber C. Kimball had boldly prophesied that Taylor would someday live in the largest and finest mansion in Salt Lake City.

References

External links

Houses completed in 1883
Houses in Salt Lake City
Properties of the Church of Jesus Christ of Latter-day Saints
The Church of Jesus Christ of Latter-day Saints in Utah
Gilded Age mansions